The Heaven Sword and Dragon Saber is a Chinese television series adapted from Louis Cha's novel of the same title. It is a final instalment of a television trilogy produced by Zhang Jizhong, preceded by The Legend of the Condor Heroes (2003) and The Return of the Condor Heroes (2006). Unlike the previous adaptations, this remake is the first to be primarily based on the third edition of the novel. The series was first broadcast on Wenzhou TV in China in October 2009.

Cast

 Deng Chao as Zhang Wuji
 Shi Lei as Zhang Wuji (young)
 Ady An as Zhao Min
 Liu Jing as Zhou Zhiruo
 Guo Bailu as Zhou Zhiruo (young)
 He Zhuoyan as Xiaozhao
Zhang Meng as Yin Li / Zhu'er
 Jiang Yiyi as Yin Li / Zhu'er (young)
 Lu Chen as Yang Buhui
 Lu Ziyi as Yang Buhui (young)
 Zang Jinsheng as Xie Xun
 Ken Chang as Zhang Cuishan
 Wang Yuanke as Yin Susu
 Wang Jinghua as Miejue
 Li Shun as Ding Minjun
 He Jiayi as Ji Xiaofu
 Yu Chenghui as Zhang Sanfeng
 Li Tai as Song Qingshu
 Chen Jiming as Song Yuanqiao
 Wang Jiusheng as Yin Liting
 Guo Jun as Zhang Songxi
 Wang Jianguo as Yu Lianzhou
 Zhang Hengping as Yu Daiyan
 Wang Zhigang as Mo Shenggu
 Tan Feiling as Cheng Kun
 Tu Men as Chaghan Temur
 Sun Zuyang as Wang Baobao
 Zhou Xiaobin as Chen Youliang
 Ma Ling as Golden Flower Granny
 Bai Junjie as Lu Zhangke
 Han Dong as He Biweng
 Wu Xiaodong as Yang Xiao
 Chen Zhihui as Yin Tianzheng / Jueyuan
 Guan Xiaoyu as Yin Yewang
 Hu Dong as Fan Yao
 Li Ming as Wei Yixiao
 Qiao Yu as Chang Yuchun
 Liu Qiang as Xu Da
 Yu Yu as Zhu Yuanzhang
 Yang Niansheng as Zhou Dian
 Zhou Gang as Shuobude
 Hou Yueqiu as Peng Yingyu
 Su Mao as Taoist Tieguan
 Zhang Yuzhou as Leng Qian
 Rocky Hou as Han Lin'er
 Wang Weiguo as Kongwen
 Tao Jixin as Kongzhi
 Cao Zhanyong as Yuanye
 Wu Kegang as Xihuazi
 Wu Xiaodong as He Taichong
 Bai Hailong as Du Dajin
 Xia Yu as Zhu Jiuzhen
 Wang Wei as Wu Qingying
 Zou Zongsheng as Wei Bi
 Xiao Zongling as Yin Wufu
 Zhou Dianying as Yan Heng
 Cecilia Liu as Yellow Dress Maiden
 Yang Yi as Shi Huolong
 Li Dan as A'san
 Liu Ziyi as Xue Gongyuan
 Lu Shaoqiang as Jian Jie
 Wu Kegang as Xihuazi
 Du Yuming as Hu Qingniu
 Gao Baobao as Wang Nangu
 Xing Minshan as He Zudao

Production
Shooting lasted five months, between 18 October 2008 and 16 March 2009. Locations include the Wudang Mountains, Peach Blossom Island, Longyou Grottoes, Wuyi Mountains and Hengdian World Studios.

Renaming of "Shaolin School" to "Monks' School"
In the series, the Shaolin School (or Shaolin Monastery) has been renamed to "Monks' School". The change is believed to be because the producers wanted to avoid trademark infringement, since Shaolin Monastery has officially registered "Shaolin" as a trademark and has been involved in lawsuits with commercial companies over the use of "Shaolin" as a brand name or trademark.

References

External links
  The Heaven Sword and Dragon Saber on Sina.com
  The Heaven Sword and Dragon Saber page on CTS's website
  The Heaven Sword and Dragon Saber at ent.qq.com

2009 Chinese television series debuts
2009 Chinese television series endings
Chinese wuxia television series
Television shows based on The Heaven Sword and Dragon Saber
Television series set in the Yuan dynasty
Sequel television series
Television series about orphans
Television shows about rebels
Television shows set on islands
Television series by Huayi Brothers